TicketBiscuit is a Birmingham, Alabama-based online ticketing company. The company provides a proprietary, web-based event management system to help small and midsize  venues, such as colleges, churches, theaters, promoters and individual artists to sell their own tickets online.

History 
TicketBiscuit was founded by Jeff Gale in 2001.

In 2008 the company launched BattlePass, which it calls the first ticketing system built specifically for combat sports. It also built WhistleTix, a ticketing system for tourist railroads, and Promotozoa, a tool that provides a link allowing visitors to client Web sites to share information about upcoming events.  The same year the company also announced integrations with the event listing site Eventful and the social networking site Facebook.

In 2009, the company added more mobile ticketing features to provide event organizers and venues with web pages optimized for viewing on mobile phones and give customers the ability to purchase tickets via these mobile-optimized web pages.

TicketBiscuit has a company blog where the authors provide "commentary, research, rants, and reviews."

References

External links 
 TicketBiscuit.com
 TicketBiscuit Blog
 TicketBiscuit Ticketing

Online companies of the United States
American companies established in 2001
Companies based in Birmingham, Alabama